Universal Audenried Charter High School , formerly Charles Y. Audenried High School, is a high school servicing the Grays Ferry area of Philadelphia. The school was originally located at the Charles Y. Audenried Junior High School but was rebuilt in 2008. It was previously directly operated by the School District of Philadelphia. It is still a part of the district's system, and some South Philadelphia residences are assigned to Audenried.

In 2011 the School Reform Commission awarded Universal Companies the contract to operate Audenried. Several members of the community, including teachers, and students, were saying that the decision was unfair since Audenried was improving and that previous data from 2005, before the school moved into a new building, were used; more recent state test data were not available.

Feeder patterns
Students zoned to the following schools are assigned to Audenried:
 Alcorn School (Grays Ferry) - K-8 school
 Chester A. Arthur School - K-8 school
 Edwin Vare Middle School
 Stephen Girard Elementary School

Notes

External links

Universal Audenried Charter High School

Audenried, Charles Y. High School
Public high schools in Pennsylvania
Charter schools in Pennsylvania